This is a list of destinations operated to by Virgin America, a former American airline that was headquartered in Burlingame, California. On April 4, 2016, the airline announced it had agreed to be acquired by Alaska Air Group, with the transaction closing by December 14, 2016. Virgin America's air operator's certificate was later merged with the certificate of Alaska Airlines on January 11, 2018, with both airlines merging into the same passenger service system on April 25, 2018.

The list includes destinations that Virgin America was serving or had formerly served by April 24, 2018, prior to the airline's merger with Alaska Airlines. At the time, Virgin America was serving 30 destinations, consisting of 27 domestic destinations and three destinations in Mexico.

Destinations

References 

Lists of airline destinations